Bank of America Plaza may refer to:

 Bank of America Plaza (Atlanta), Georgia
 Bank of America Plaza (Charlotte), North Carolina
 Bank of America Plaza (Chicago), Illinois
 Bank of America Plaza (Dallas), Texas
 Bank of America Plaza (Fort Lauderdale), Florida
 Bank of America Plaza (Nashville), Tennessee
 Bank of America Plaza (New York City), New York (now known as 335 Madison Avenue)
 Bank of America Plaza (St. Louis), Missouri
 Bank of America Plaza (San Antonio), Texas
 Bank of America Plaza (Tampa), Florida
 Bank of America Plaza (Tucson), Arizona

See also
 Bank of America Building (disambiguation)
 Bank of America Center (disambiguation)
 Bank of America Tower (disambiguation)